The Guavio Province is one of the 15 provinces in the Cundinamarca department, Colombia. Guavio borders the Capital District of Bogotá and the Central Savanna Province to the west, to the north the Almeidas Province, to the east the Boyacá Department and Medina Province and to the south the Meta Department and the Eastern Province. The Alberto Lleras Dam is also located in this area. The eastern municipalities Gachalá and Ubalá are rich in emeralds.

Subdivision 
Guavio Province is subdivided into 8 municipalities:

References

External links 
  Guavio Province in Cundinamarca
  Description Guavio Province - Universidad de los Andes

Provinces of Cundinamarca Department